Hiram Warren Johnson (September 2, 1866August 6, 1945) was an American attorney and politician who served as the 23rd governor of California from 1911 to 1917. Johnson achieved national prominence in the early 20th century. He was elected in 1916 as the United States Senator from California, where he was  re-elected to five terms and served until his death in 1945.

As a governor, Johnson was a leading American progressive. He ran for vice president on Theodore Roosevelt's Progressive ticket in the 1912 presidential election. As a US senator, Johnson became a leading liberal isolationist, among those "Irreconcilables" who opposed the Treaty of Versailles and rejected the League of Nations. Later, Johnson was also a vocal opponent of the United Nations Charter.

After having worked as a stenographer and reporter, Johnson embarked on a legal career. He began his practice in his hometown of Sacramento, California. After he moved to San Francisco, he worked as an assistant district attorney. Gaining statewide renown for his prosecutions of public corruption, Johnson won the 1910 California gubernatorial election with the backing of the Lincoln–Roosevelt League. He instituted several progressive reforms, establishing a railroad commission and introducing aspects of direct democracy, such as the power to recall state officials. Having joined with Roosevelt and other progressives to form the Progressive Party, Johnson won the party's 1912 vice-presidential nomination. In one of the best third-party performances in U.S. history, the ticket finished second nationally in the popular and electoral votes.

Johnson was elected to the US Senate in 1916, becoming a leader of the chamber's Progressive Republicans. He made his biggest mark in the Senate as an early voice for isolationism, opposing U.S. entry into World War I and U.S. participation in the League of Nations.

He unsuccessfully sought the Republican presidential nomination in 1920 and 1924. He supported Democratic nominee Franklin D. Roosevelt in the 1932 presidential election. While Johnson initially supported many of Roosevelt's New Deal programs, by November 1936 he became violently hostile to Roosevelt as a potential dictator. Johnson was in increasingly poor health in his later years, but remained in the Senate until his death in 1945.

Early years
Hiram Johnson was born in Sacramento on September 2, 1866. His father, Grove Lawrence Johnson, was an attorney and  Republican U.S. Representative and a member of the California State Legislature whose career was marred by accusations of election fraud and graft. His mother, Annie De Montfredy, was a member of the Daughters of the American Revolution based on her descent from Pierre Van Cortlandt and Philip Van Cortlandt. Johnson had one brother and three sisters.

Johnson attended the public schools of Sacramento and was 16 when he graduated from Sacramento High School in 1882 as the class valedictorian. Too young to begin attending college, Johnson worked as a shorthand reporter and stenographer in his father's law office and attended Heald's Business College. He studied law at the University of California, Berkeley from 1884 to 1886, where he was a member of the Chi Phi Fraternity. After his admission to the bar in 1888, Johnson practiced in Sacramento with his brother Albert as the firm of Johnson & Johnson.

In addition to practicing law, Johnson was active in politics as a Republican, including supporting his father's campaigns. In 1899, Johnson backed the mayoral campaign of George H. Clark. Clark won, and when he took office in 1900, he named Johnson as city attorney.

In 1902, Johnson moved to San Francisco, where he quickly developed a reputation as a fearless litigator, primarily as a criminal defense lawyer, while becoming became active in reform politics. He attracted statewide attention in 1908 when he assisted District Attorney Francis J. Heney in the prosecution of Abe Ruef and Mayor Eugene Schmitz for graft. After Heney was shot in the courtroom during an attempted assassination, Johnson took the lead for the prosecution and won the case.

Governor of California (1911–17)

In 1910, Johnson won the gubernatorial election as a member of the Lincoln–Roosevelt League, a Progressive Republican movement, running on a platform opposed to the Southern Pacific Railroad. During his campaign, he toured the state in an open automobile, covering thousands of miles and visiting small communities throughout California that were inaccessible by rail. Johnson helped establish rules that made voting and the political process easier. For example, he established rules to facilitate recalls. This measure was used to terminate Governor Gray Davis in 2003 and an unsuccessful effort to terminate Governor Gavin Newsom in 2021.

In office, Johnson was a populist who promoted a number of democratic reforms: the election of U.S. Senators by direct popular vote rather than the state legislature (which was later ratified nationwide by a constitutional amendment), cross-filing, initiative, referendum, and recall elections. Johnson's reforms gave California a degree of direct democracy unmatched by any other U.S. state at the time.

Johnson was also instrumental in reining in the power of the Southern Pacific Railroad through the establishment of a state railroad commission. On taking office, Johnson paroled Chris Evans, convicted as the Southern Pacific train bandit, but required that he leave California.

Although initially opposed to the bill, Johnson gave in to political pressure and supported the California Alien Land Law of 1913, which prevented Asian immigrants from owning land in the state (they were already excluded from naturalized citizenship because of their race).

1912 vice presidential campaign

In 1912, Johnson was a founder of the national Progressive Party and ran as the party's vice presidential candidate, sharing a ticket with former President Theodore Roosevelt. Roosevelt and Johnson narrowly carried California but finished second nationally behind the Democratic ticket of Woodrow Wilson and Thomas Marshall. Their second-place finish, ahead of incumbent Republican President William Howard Taft, remains among the strongest for any third party in American history.

Johnson was re-elected governor of California in 1914 as the Progressive Party candidate, gaining nearly twice the votes of his Republican opponent John D. Fredericks.

U.S. Senator (1917–45)

In 1916, Johnson ran successfully for the U.S. Senate, defeating Democrat George S. Patton Sr. He took office on March 16, 1917. Johnson was elected as a staunch opponent of American entry into World War I, and allegedly said, "The first casualty when war comes is truth." However, this quote may be apocryphal. As an isolationist, Johnson voted against the League of Nations during his first term.

During his Senate career, Johnson served as chairman of the Committees on Cuban Relations (Sixty-sixth Congress), Patents (Sixty-seventh Congress), Immigration (Sixty-eighth through Seventy-first Congresses), Territories and Insular Possessions (Sixty-eighth Congress), and Commerce (Seventy-first and Seventy-second Congresses).

In the Senate, Johnson helped push through the Immigration Act of 1924, having worked with Valentine S. McClatchy and other anti-Japanese lobbyists to prohibit Japanese and other East Asian immigrants from entering the United States.

In the early 1920s, the motion picture industry sought to establish a self-regulatory process to fend off official censorship. Senator Johnson was among three candidates identified to head a new group, alongside Herbert Hoover and Will H. Hays. Hays, who had managed President Harding's 1920 campaign, was ultimately named to head the new Motion Picture Producers and Distributors of America in early 1922.

As Senator, Johnson proved extremely popular. In 1934, he was re-elected with 94.5 percent of the popular vote; he was nominated by both the Republican and Democratic parties and his only opponent was Socialist George Ross Kirkpatrick.

In 1943, a confidential analysis of the Senate Foreign Relations Committee, made by British scholar Isaiah Berlin for his Foreign Office, stated that Johnson:
is the Isolationists' elder statesman and the only surviving member of the [William E.] Borah-[Henry Cabot] Lodge-Johnson combination which led the fight against the League in 1919 and 1920. He is an implacable and uncompromising Isolationist with immense prestige in California, of which he has twice been Governor. His election to the Senate has not been opposed for many years by either party. He is acutely Pacific-conscious and is a champion of a more adequate defence of the West Coast. He is a member of the Farm Bloc and is au fond, against foreign affairs as such; his view of Europe as a sink of iniquity has not changed in any particular since 1912, when he founded a short-lived progressive party. His prestige in Congress is still great and his parliamentary skill should not be underestimated.

In 1945, Johnson was absent when the vote took place for ratification of United Nations Charter, but made it known that he would have voted against this outcome. Senators Henrik Shipstead and William Langer were the only ones to cast votes opposing ratification.

Presidential politics
Following Theodore Roosevelt's death in January 1919, Johnson was the most prominent leader in the surviving progressive movement; the Progressive Party of 1912 was dead. In 1920 he ran for the Republican nomination for president but was defeated by conservative Senator Warren Harding. Johnson did not get the support of Roosevelt's family, who instead supported Roosevelt's long-time friend Leonard Wood. At the convention, Johnson was asked to serve as Harding's running mate, but he declined.

Johnson sought the 1924 Republican nomination against President Calvin Coolidge, but his campaign was derailed after he lost the California primary. Johnson declined to challenge Herbert Hoover for the 1928 presidential nomination, instead choosing to seek re-election to the Senate.

In the 1932 presidential election, Johnson broke with President Hoover. He was one of the most prominent Republicans to support Democrat Franklin D. Roosevelt. During Roosevelt's first term, Johnson supported the president's New Deal economic recovery package and frequently 'crossed the floor' to aid the Democrats.  By late 1936 he was convinced that Roosevelt was a very dangerous would-be dictator. Johnson, although in poor health, attacked Roosevelt and the New Deal following FDR's attempt to take control of the Supreme Court in 1937.

Personal life

In January 1886, Johnson married Minne L. McNeal (1869-1947). The couple had two sons: Hiram W. "Jack" Johnson, Jr. (1886-1959), and Archibald "Archie" McNeal Johnson (1890-1933). Both sons practiced law in California and served in the army. Hiram Jr. was a veteran of World War I, and attained the rank of lieutenant colonel in the Army Air Corps while stationed at Fort Mason in San Francisco during World War II. Archie Johnson was a major of field artillery corps and was wounded in action during the First World War.

Death

Having served in the Senate for almost thirty years, Johnson died in the Naval Hospital in Bethesda, Maryland, on August 6, 1945, the same day as the US conducted atomic bombing of Hiroshima. He had been in failing health for several months. He was interred in a mausoleum constructed at Cypress Lawn Memorial Park in Colma, California and his remains are interred with those of his wife, Minnie, and two sons.

Legacy
During his first term gubernatorial inaugural address on Jan. 3, 1911, Johnson declared that his first duty was “to eliminate every private interest from the government and to make the public service of the State responsive solely to the people.”  Committed to “arm the people to protect themselves” against such abuses, Johnson proposed amending the state Constitution with “the initiative, the referendum and the recall.” All three of these progressive reforms were enacted during his governorship, forever guaranteeing Johnson's stature as the preeminent progressive reformer of California politics.  His contribution as the driving force behind the direct democratic process for removal of elected officials was revisited in the media and by the general public during the successful 2003 California recall election of Democrat governor Gray Davis. Republican Arnold Schwarzenegger, the eventual winner, referred to Johnson's progressive legacy in his campaign speeches.  Johnson's stature in fostering the California recall and ballot initiative direct democratic processes again surfaced in the media during the unsuccessful 2021 California recall election of Democrat governor Gavin Newsom. 

On August 25, 2009, Governor Schwarzenegger and his wife, Maria Shriver, announced that Johnson would be one of 13 inducted into the California Hall of Fame that year.

Johnson held the record as California's longest-serving United States Senator for over 75 years, until it was broken by Democrat Dianne Feinstein on March 28, 2021. He remains the longest serving Republican senator from California.

The Hiram Johnson papers, consisting primarily of hundreds of letters that Johnson wrote to his two sons over the course of decades, and that his son, Hiram Jr. donated in 1955, reside at the Bancroft Library at the University of California, Berkeley.

Hiram Johnson High School in Sacramento, California is named in his honor.

See also
 List of United States Congress members who died in office (1900–49)

Notes

References

Further reading
 Blackford, Mansel Griffiths. "Businessmen and the regulation of railroads and public utilities in California during the Progressive Era." Business History Review 44.03 (1970): 307–319.
 Feinman, Ronald L. Twilight of progressivism: the western Republican senators and the New Deal (Johns Hopkins University Press, 1981)
 Le Pore, Herbert P. "Prelude to Prejudice: Hiram Johnson, Woodrow Wilson, and the California Alien Land Law Controversy of 1913." Southern California Quarterly (1979): 99–110. in JSTOR
 McKee, Irving. "The Background and Early Career of Hiram Warren Johnson, 1866–1910." Pacific Historical Review (1950): 17–30. in JSTOR
 Miller, Karen A.J. Populist nationalism: Republican insurgency and American foreign policy making, 1918–1925  (Greenwood, 1999)
 Olin, Spencer C. California's prodigal sons: Hiram Johnson and the Progressives, 1911–1917 (U of California Press, 1968)
 Olin, Spencer C. "Hiram Johnson, the California Progressives, and the Hughes Campaign of 1916." The Pacific Historical Review (1962): 403–412. in JSTOR
 Olin, Spencer C. "Hiram Johnson, the Lincoln-Roosevelt League, and the Election of 1910." California Historical Society Quarterly (1966): 225–240. in JSTOR
 Shover, John L. "The progressives and the working class vote in California." Labor History (1969) 10#4 pp: 584–601. online
 Weatherson, Michael A., and Hal Bochin. Hiram Johnson: Political Revivalist (University Press of America, 1995)
 Weatherson, Michael A., and Hal Bochin. Hiram Johnson: A Bio-Bibliography (Greenwood Press, 1988)

Unpublished PhD dissertations that are online
 Dewitt, Howard Arthur. "Hiram W. Johnson and American Foreign Policy, 1917-1941" (The University Of Arizona; Proquest Dissertations Publishing, 1972. 7215602).
 Fitzpatrick, John James, III. "Senator Hiram W. Johnson: A Life History, 1866-1945." (University Of California, Berkeley; Proquest Dissertations Publishing, 1975. 7526691).
 Liljekvist, Clifford B. "Senator Hiram Johnson" (University Of Southern California; Proquest Dissertations Publishing, 1953. Dp28687)
 Nichols, Egbert R., Jr. "An Investigation Of The Contributions Of The Public Speaking Of Hiram W. Johnson To His Political Career" (University Of Southern California; Proquest Dissertations Publishing, 1948. 0154027).
 Weatherson, Michael Allen. "A Political Revivalist: " The Public Speaking Of Hiram W. Johnson, 1866-1945" (Indiana University; Proquest Dissertations Publishing, 1985. 8516663).

Primary sources
 Johnson, Hiram. The diary letters of Hiram Johnson, 1917–1945 (Vol. 1. Garland Publishing, 1983)

External links

 
 Guide to the Hiram Johnson Papers at the Bancroft Library

Archives 
 Robert E. Burke Collection. 1892-1994. 60.43 cubic feet (68 boxes plus two oversize folders and one oversize vertical file). At the Labor Archives of Washington, University of Washington Libraries Special Collections. Contains materials collected by Burke on Hiram Johnson from  1910-1994.

|-

|-

|-

|-

|-

|-

|-

|-

|-

|-

1866 births
1912 United States vice-presidential candidates
1945 deaths
20th-century American Episcopalians
20th-century American politicians
American Episcopalians
American people of French descent
Articles containing video clips
Burials at Cypress Lawn Memorial Park
California Progressives (1912)
Candidates in the 1920 United States presidential election
Candidates in the 1924 United States presidential election
Direct democracy activists
District attorneys in California
Republican Party governors of California
Heald College alumni
History of San Francisco
Non-interventionism
Politicians from Sacramento, California
Politicians from San Francisco
Progressive Party (1912) state governors of the United States
Republican Party United States senators from California
University of California, Berkeley alumni
Anti-Japanese sentiment